Comamonas badia is a Gram-negative, oxidase-positive, catalase-positive, aerobic, rod-shaped, highly motile bacterium with a single polar flagellum from the genus Comamonas and family Comamonadaceae, which was isolated from activate sludge in Japan.

References

External links
Type strain of Comamonas badia at BacDive -  the Bacterial Diversity Metadatabase

Comamonadaceae
Bacteria described in 2005